Following are the results of the 2007-08 Owen Cup, the Staffordshire, England Rugby Union Cup played at Senior Level.

Knockout stage

Preliminary round

Barton    29   0   Stone

Linley  3   11  Eccleshall

Final

References

Owen Cup
Owen Cup